South Trade Street Houses are a set of three historic homes located at Winston-Salem, Forsyth County, North Carolina. They are known as the Sussdorf, Ackerman and Patterson Houses and associated with the Moravian community of Salem. The Sussdorf House was built in 1838, and is a two-story, four-bay-by-two-bay, brick dwelling. The Ackerman House was built in 1856, and is a two-story brick dwelling with a full-width, hip-roof Victorian porch.  The Patterson House was built in 1857, and is a two-story, three-bay-by-two-bay, brick dwelling.

It was listed on the National Register of Historic Places in 1978.

References

Houses on the National Register of Historic Places in North Carolina
Houses completed in 1857
Houses in Winston-Salem, North Carolina
National Register of Historic Places in Winston-Salem, North Carolina
1857 establishments in North Carolina